Allen Pearson was the Director of the National Severe Storms Forecast Center from 1965 to 1979 and began to collaborate with Tetsuya Theodore "Ted" Fujita on tornado physical characteristics soon after the 1970 Lubbock Tornado. They bounced ideas off each other and the Fujita scale (F-scale) and later the FPP scale was the result. Pearson had devised the computerized encoding of the tornado base, which included the F-P-P estimates. Pearson's major role was to get the cooperation of the NWS State Climatologists and to extend the computerized data base backwards to the 1950s.

Pearson was awarded the Department of Commerce's gold medal in 1974 for "...forecasting of severe local storms...which included the Super Outbreak of April 3–4, 1974". Pearson successfully lobbied the United States Congress in the mid-1970s for satellite readout and computer equipment that the National Weather Service could not provide. This ultimately led to the sophisticated methodology in use today at the Storm Prediction Center in Norman, Oklahoma.

He retired from the National Weather Service in 1981, and lived in Shreveport, Louisiana. Pearson was born on July 28, 1925, in Mankato, Minnesota, served in the U.S. Navy and joined the U.S. Weather Bureau (now NOAA) in 1951. He holds an M.S. from the University of Hawaii and B.A.S. from University of California, Los Angeles. He died on August 11, 2016 in Bossier City, Louisiana, at the age of 91.

References

External links
Tornado Project
USA Today on the 'Fujita scale'

American meteorologists
Department of Commerce Gold Medal
1925 births
2016 deaths
National Weather Service people